Mylene Dizon is a Filipino actress and model. Dizon has established herself as one of the most renowned actresses in Philippine cinema with an astounding 30 films and nearly 50 television roles to her credit, as well as three Best Actress Awards from Cinemalaya, Gawad Urian, and Golden Screen Awards for her performance in the film "100."

She was a member of ABS-CBN's Star Magic, being an alumna of Batch 2. After starting with ABS-CBN in 1996, she transferred to the rival station GMA Network in 2003 as a GMA Artist Center member and was part of several TV series like Captain Barbell, Agawin Mo Man ang Lahat, and Dyesebel. Upon returning to ABS-CBN in 2009, she made a special appearance on Tayong Dalawa. Her role ended when she became pregnant with her second child, and was then replaced by Jodi Sta. Maria.

Recently, she played Grace Maniego in the 2011 drama Budoy, and later had a special participation role in the 2012 drama Kahit Puso'y Masugatan as Fatima San Jose. She also appeared in Kahit Konting Pagtingin, Huwag Ka Lang Mawawala, and most recently in Mirabella. She was part of the cast of the second season of Ikaw Lamang (2014) as Tessa. She transferred back to GMA Network in 2014 and made her comeback in Once Upon a Kiss starring Bianca Umali and Miguel Tanfelix. She returned to ABS-CBN and portrayed the role of Laura Hipolito-Suarez in afternoon melodrama series Doble Kara (2015–17), and received critical acclaim for her performance along with Julia Montes. She played Racquel A. Reyes-Moreno in the family drama series The Good Son along with Eula Valdez and John Estrada. She returns to GMA Network once again to play Manisan Arati in Sahaya. She is currently a freelancer and is doing projects with both ABS-CBN and GMA-7.

Career
Dizon's career began with being an alumna of the Batch 2 of ABS-CBN's Star Magic. She was then cast to be part of the teen-oriented series Gimik (1996–99) as Melanie Suntay, and she would once again reunite with them in 2010 during a series entitled Gimik 2010. Her big break arrived when she played the role as antagonist Sally Perida in Sa Dulo ng Walang Hanggan (2001–03), alongside Claudine Barretto and Carlos Agassi. Dizon then reunited with her Gimik co-stars when she starred in a movie based on the series titled Gimik: The Reunion in 1999, reprising her role as Melanie Suntay.

After spending several years with ABS-CBN, Dizon transferred to its rival network GMA Network. She starred in several series including Narito ang Puso Ko (2003–04), Agawin Mo Man ang Lahat (2006), Captain Barbell (2006–07), and the original version of Dyesebel (2008). Dizon made her film debut in 2006 while starring in the lesbian movie Rome and Juliet playing the role of Rome Miranda. She got two nominations for Best Actress. She then participated in the movie Shake, Rattle & Roll X (2008) in the segment "Emergency", portraying the role of an Aswang Wife.

Dizon then returned to her home network, ABS-CBN, and made a special appearance on the critically acclaimed prime time series, Tayong Dalawa (2009). She won a Best Ensemble Performance in a Television Drama. Her character was then replaced by Jodi Sta. Maria. She then became part of Tanging Yaman (2010), starring with Erich Gonzales, Melissa Ricks, Agot Isidro, Jodi Sta. Maria, and Rowell Santiago. After Tanging Yaman ended, Dizon became part of the remake version of the hit 90s series Mara Clara (1992–97). The series was also titled Mara Clara (2010–11), featuring a whole new cast including new stars Kathryn Bernardo and Julia Montes. Dizon played the role of Susan David, Mara's loving mother who tries to protect her daughter. The role was originally portrayed by Susan Africa.

Shortly after Mara Clara, she starred in the prime time series Budoy (2011–12) as Grace Maniego, Budoy's evil godmother who wants to kill him. Dizon then has a special participation role in Kahit Puso'y Masugatan (2012). She then was part of Juan dela Cruz (2013), playing the role of Amelia dela Cruz, Juan's deceased mother. Dizon was then cast to be in My Little Juan (2013), reprising the role of Amelia. She then became a part of the primetime revenge series Huwag Ka Lang Mawawala (2013), a series starring Judy Ann Santos.

She then played the role as antagonist Olive Robles in Mirabella (2014) and then became part of the book 2 cast of Ikaw Lamang (2014) as Tessa Villanueva, Franco's mistress who is obsessed over him. After spending years with ABS-CBN, she came back to the Kapuso channel, GMA Network. Dizon starred in Once Upon a Kiss (2015), playing the role of Giselle Almario, the main villain. Dizon then was part of the realistic-fiction movie Heneral Luna (2015) and won a Best Supporting Actress for it in 2016.

Dizon then returned to her home network ABS-CBN later in 2015 to star in the critically acclaimed afternoon series Doble Kara (2015–17). This marks the second collaboration between Dizon and Montes, four years after Mara Clara had ended. She starred alongside Carmina Villarroel, Ariel Rivera, Allen Dizon, Sam Milby, Alicia Alonzo, Maxene Magalona, Edgar Allan Guzman, and John Lapus. The series was met with mostly positive reviews and strong ratings, and got three PMPC Star Award nominations, and won Best Daytime Drama. After Doble Kara, Dizon is set to star in the primetime series The Good Son (2017), alongside John Estrada and Eula Valdez.

In 2019, she made a comeback on GMA Network to play a mother role in Sahaya.

In 2020, due to Dizon's freelance status, she completed Bilangin ang Bituin sa Langit in GMA and is currently doing Huwag Kang Mangamba on ABS-CBN with a 2021 release.

Personal life
Dizon has two sons, Tomas and Lucas, with ex-boyfriend Paolo Paraiso.

She is now in a relationship with former La Salle superstar and PBA basketball coach Jason Webb.

Filmography

Television

Film

Awards and nominations

References

External links
 

Year of birth missing (living people)
1970s births
Living people
Filipino television actresses
Filipino film actresses
ABS-CBN personalities
GMA Network personalities
Filipino people of Kapampangan descent
People from Manila